Best E.P Selection of Tokio is the first compilation album by Japanese band Tokio. It was released on March 26, 1997. The album reached fourth place on the Oricon weekly chart and charted for five weeks.

Track listing 
All lyrics are written by Tetsuo Kudou, except where indicated; all music is composed by Takashi Tsushimi, except where indicated; all music is arranged by Ryoumei Shirai, except where indicated.

Personnel 

 Shigeru Joshima - guitar
 Tomoya Nagase - lead vocalist, guitar
 Masahiro Matsuoka - drums
 Taichi Kokubun - keyboard
 Tatsuya Yamaguchi - bass
 Hiromu Kojima - rhythm guitarist, replaced by Tomoya Nagase

Release history

References 

1996 greatest hits albums
Tokio (band) albums